Lake Sumner Forest Park is a  forest park located in the Canterbury region of the South Island of New Zealand. It is centered around Lewis Pass and has a number of access points along State Highway 7. It sits in between Lewis Pass Scenic Reserve and Arthurs Pass National Park.

The name is derived from Lake Sumner, although Lake Sumner itself is not located in the Forest Park.

Hot Springs 
There are numerous hot springs to be found in Lake Sumner Forest Park. One of the easiest to find is above the Hurunui river between The Hurunui Hut and No. 3 Hut.

See also
Forest Parks of New Zealand
Protected areas of New Zealand

References

External links

 Department of Conservation - Lake Sumner Conservation Park (webarchive)
 Lake Summer Forest Park (Department of Conservation)
 Lake Sumner Forest Park tramping tracks (Department of Conservation)

Forest parks of New Zealand
Parks in Canterbury, New Zealand